The Ducharme Bridge (French: Pont Ducharme) is a covered bridge with a lattice truss structure, which crosses the Bostonnais River in the center of La Bostonnais, Quebec. It was classified as a historic monument in 2006, because it was a late example of an elaborated town bridge, a truss developed by the Departement of colonization of Quebec at the turn of the 20th century. It was named after Romulus Ducharme, MLA of Laviolette in 1936-1939 and 1944–1966.

External links
 

Covered bridges in Canada
Transport in Mauricie
Heritage buildings of Quebec
Buildings and structures in Mauricie
La Tuque, Quebec
Heritage sites in Mauricie